Giorgi Gorozia ; born 26 March 1995) is a Georgian footballer who plays as a midfielder.

Career

Club
Gorozia started his career at Lokomotivi Tbilisi, where he had a loan spell at FC Torpedo Kutaisi before moving to Norwegian club Stabæk Fotball on a three-year contract in August 2014. Gorozia made his début for Stabæk in a 1–1 home draw against Viking on 19 October 2014 in the Tippeligaen.

On 17 February 2017, Gorozia signed for Zira FK until the end of the 2016–17 season.

On 25 July 2018, Gorozia signed for RoPS.

International
Gorozia has represented Georgia at under-17, under-19 and under-21 level. Even though he was born in Russia and possesses Russian citizenship, that makes him ineligible for the Russia national football team and therefore he is considered a foreign player when he plays for Russian clubs.

Career statistics

References

External links
 
 Giorgi Gorozia at Eurosport

1995 births
Russian people of Georgian descent
Living people
Sportspeople from Samara, Russia
Footballers from Georgia (country)
Association football midfielders
FC Lokomotivi Tbilisi players
FC Torpedo Kutaisi players
Stabæk Fotball players
Zira FK players
Hibernians F.C. players
Rovaniemen Palloseura players
FC Dynamo Bryansk players
Erovnuli Liga players
Eliteserien players
Azerbaijan Premier League players
Maltese Premier League players
Veikkausliiga players
Georgia (country) youth international footballers
Georgia (country) under-21 international footballers
Expatriate footballers from Georgia (country)
Expatriate sportspeople from Georgia (country) in Norway
Expatriate sportspeople from Georgia (country) in Azerbaijan
Expatriate sportspeople from Georgia (country) in Malta
Expatriate sportspeople from Georgia (country) in Finland
Expatriate footballers in Norway
Expatriate footballers in Azerbaijan
Expatriate footballers in Malta
Expatriate footballers in Finland